Irina Filishtinskaya (born 14 June 1990) is a Russian volleyball player for WVC Dinamo Kazan and the Russian national team.

She participated at the 2017 Women's European Volleyball Championship,. and 2017 FIVB Volleyball World Grand Prix.

References

1990 births
Living people
Russian women's volleyball players
Sportspeople from Bashkortostan
Volleyball players at the 2015 European Games
European Games competitors for Russia
Universiade medalists in volleyball
Universiade gold medalists for Russia
Medalists at the 2015 Summer Universiade
20th-century Russian women
21st-century Russian women